The 1968 Middle Tennessee Blue Raiders football team represented Middle Tennessee State University—as a member of the Ohio Valley Conference (OVC) during the 1968 NCAA College Division football season. Led by 22nd-year head coach Charles M. Murphy, the Blue Raiders compiled a record an overall record of 2–8 with a mark of 1–6 in conference play, tying for seventh place in the OVC. The team's captains were Daniel, Mathews, and Claxton.

Schedule

References

Middle Tennessee
Middle Tennessee Blue Raiders football seasons
Middle Tennessee Blue Raiders football